Sulimov is a municipality and village in Kroměříž District in the Zlín Region of the Czech Republic. It has about 200 inhabitants.

History
The first written mention of Sulimov is from 1353.

References

Villages in Kroměříž District